Sawahikari Yukio (born 18 June 1941 as Yukio Sawamukai) is a former sumo wrestler from Saroma, Hokkaidō, Japan. He made his professional debut in September 1956 and reached the top division in November 1963. His highest rank was komusubi. He left the sumo world upon retirement from active competition in November 1964.

Career record
The Kyushu tournament was first held in 1957, and the Nagoya tournament in 1958.

See also
Glossary of sumo terms
List of past sumo wrestlers
List of sumo tournament second division champions
List of komusubi

References

1941 births
Living people
Japanese sumo wrestlers
Sumo people from Hokkaido
Komusubi